Dasril Panin Datuk Labuan (6 August 1947 – 13 February 2022) was an Indonesian politician. A member of Golkar and later the Indonesian Democratic Party of Struggle, he served in the People's Representative Council from 1982 to 1987 and again from 1993 to 2003. He died in Bukittinggi on 13 February 2022, at the age of 74.

References

1947 births
2022 deaths
20th-century Indonesian politicians
Golkar politicians
Indonesian Democratic Party of Struggle politicians
University of Indonesia alumni
People from West Sumatra
Members of the People's Representative Council, 1982
Members of the People's Representative Council, 1992
Members of the People's Representative Council, 1997
Members of the People's Representative Council, 1999